McKern is a surname. Notable people with the surname include:

Abigail McKern (born 1955), English actor
Howard McKern (1917–2009), Australian chemist and museum administrator
Leo McKern (1920–2002), Australian-born English actor

See also
McKeen (surname)